Davis Cup is the debut album by American pianist Walter Davis Jr. featuring performances recorded in 1959 and released on the Blue Note label in 1960. It would be his only album for the label and one of the few recordings where he figured as the leader.

Reception

In his review for  AllMusic, Stephen Thomas Erlewine says: "Walter Davis Jr.'s debut record as a leader for Blue Note is a terrific hard bop session, a driving collection of six original tunes that emphasize the strengths not only of the pianist himself, but also his supporting band... It all adds up to a wonderful straight-ahead hard bop date, one that's so good it's a wonder that Davis didn't receive another chance to lead a session until 1979.

Track listing
All compositions by Walter Davis Jr.

 "'Smake It" – 5:08
 "Loodle-Lot" – 5:58
 "Sweetness" – 8:14
 "Rhumba Nhumba" – 6:59
 "Minor Mind" – 6:26
 "Millie's Delight" – 5:06

Personnel
Walter Davis Jr. – piano
Donald Byrd – trumpet
Jackie McLean – alto saxophone
Sam Jones – bass
Art Taylor – drums

References

Blue Note Records albums
Walter Davis Jr. albums
1960 albums
Albums produced by Alfred Lion
Albums recorded at Van Gelder Studio